Sarcosine/dimethylglycine N-methyltransferase (ApDMT, sarcosine-dimethylglycine methyltransferase, SDMT, sarcosine dimethylglycine N-methyltransferase, S-adenosyl-L-methionine:N,N-dimethylglycine N-methyltransferase) is an enzyme with systematic name S-adenosyl-L-methionine:sarcosine(or N,N-dimethylglycine) N-methyltransferase (N,N-dimethylglycine(or betaine)-forming). This enzyme catalyses the following chemical reaction

 2 S-adenosyl-L-methionine + sarcosine  2 S-adenosyl-L-homocysteine + betaine (overall reaction)
(1a) S-adenosyl-L-methionine + sarcosine  S-adenosyl-L-homocysteine + N,N-dimethylglycine
(1b) S-adenosyl-L-methionine + N,N-dimethylglycine  S-adenosyl-L-homocysteine + betaine

This enzyme participates in biosynthesis of betaine from glycine in cyanobacterium Aphanocthece halophytica.

References

External links 
 

EC 2.1.1